Thomas Osborne Davies (27 March 1882 – 1967) was an English professional footballer who played as an outside forward for various clubs between 1900 and 1910. His career started in the Southern League with his hometown club Swindon Town, before spending three years in the Football League First Division with Nottingham Forest. He then returned to the Southern League with Reading and, later, Southampton before a broken leg ended his career.

Football career
Davies was born in Swindon and played his youth football with Swindon Swifts before joining Swindon Town. He made his first-team debut playing at inside-right in an FA Cup match at Bristol East on 3 November 1900. The match was drawn 1–1, but Swindon won the replay 5–0, with Davies scoring the first goal. He retained his place in the side, scoring in each of the next two matches in the FA Cup, against Staple Hill. He also played regularly in both the Western League and the Southern League. At the end of his first season with Swindon's first-team, the club finished at the bottom of the table and had to play-off against Brentford to retain their First Division status.

During the next season, Davies switched his position to outside-right as Swindon again finished at the bottom of the table and had to play-off (against Fulham) to avoid relegation. Davies remained with Swindon until 1903, with his final match coming on the opening day of the 1903–04 season. In his three years at The County Ground, Davies made a total of 109 first-team appearances, scoring 14 goals.

He then moved to Nottingham Forest, of the Football League First Division, where he stayed until the end of the 1905–06 season, when Forest were relegated to the Second Division. In his three years at Forest, he made 39 league appearances, scoring once. Following relegation, he spent two years back in the Southern League First Division with Reading before dropping down to the Second Division with Salisbury City in 1908.

In April 1909, he was invited to The Dell for a trial which led to a permanent move to Southampton. He made his debut for the "Saints" in the opening match of the 1909–10 season, a 1–0 victory over Plymouth Argyle. Described as a "dapper little striker" he soon became a crowd favourite and played in the first six matches, scoring once. He then lost his place at outside-right to John Bainbridge who had returned from injury. Davies spent the rest of the season in the reserves, making only two further first-team appearances.

In March 1910, he broke his leg in a reserve-team match at Eastleigh Athletic which brought his football career to a close.

Family
Davies' younger brother, Bertie was also a player with Swindon Town, for whom he made 276 first-team appearances before becoming assistant manager to Louis Page in 1949.

References

External links
 Football career details

1882 births
Sportspeople from Swindon
1967 deaths
English footballers
Association football forwards
Swindon Town F.C. players
Nottingham Forest F.C. players
Reading F.C. players
Salisbury City F.C. (1905) players
Southampton F.C. players
Southern Football League players
English Football League players